The representation of women in the House of Commons of the United Kingdom has been an issue in the politics of the United Kingdom at numerous points in the 20th and 21st centuries. Originally debate centred on whether women should be allowed to vote and stand for election as Members of Parliament. The Parliament (Qualification of Women) Act 1918 gave women over 21 the right to stand for election as a Member of Parliament. The United Kingdom has had three female Prime Ministers: Margaret Thatcher (1979–1990), Theresa May (2016–2019), and Liz Truss (2022). The publication of the book Women in the House by Elizabeth Vallance in 1979 highlighted the under-representation of women in Parliament. In more modern times concerns about the under-representation of women led the Labour Party to introduce and, decades later, abandon all-women short lists, something which was later held to breach discrimination laws.

Between 1918 and 2023, a total of 561 women have been elected as Members of the House of Commons. As of February 2023 there are 225 women in the House of Commons, the highest ever. This is a new all-time high at 35% and is the first time that female representation in the House of Commons is at more than a third. The previous number was 208, set in 2017, which accounted for 32% of members elected or re-elected that year. Additionally, at the 2019 general election more female than male Labour MPs were elected or re-elected (104 women out of 202 MPs in total) – the first time in Labour's history that this has happened. The female member of Parliament with the longest period of continuous service is currently informally known as the Mother of the House.

Suffrage

In 1832 Henry Hunt became the first MP to raise the issue of women's suffrage in the House of Commons, followed in 1867 by John Stuart Mill. Following this attempts were made to widen the franchise in every Parliament.

Women gained the right to vote with the passing of the Representation of the People Act 1918 after World War I. This gave the vote to women over the age of 30. However, the Speakers Conference which was charged with looking into giving women the vote did not have as its terms of reference, consideration to women standing as candidates for Parliament. However, Sir Herbert Samuel, the former Liberal Home Secretary, moved a separate motion on 23 October 1918 to allow women to be eligible as Members of Parliament. The vote was passed by 274 to 25 and the government rushed through a bill to make it law in time for the 1918 general election. This bill did not specify any age restriction, unlike the voting bill. This later led to a number of incidents of women under the age of 30, who were not allowed to vote, standing for Parliament, notably the 27-year-old Liberal Ursula Williams standing in 1923.

Landmarks and records

Political firsts for women in House of Commons 
 1918: Women able to stand for Parliament.
 1918: First woman elected to Parliament (Constance Markievicz). However, as a member of Sinn Féin, she did not take her seat. Markievicz also became the only woman to represent an Irish constituency in Parliament until 1922 and the first female member who, before the election, chose to become a Catholic.
 1919: Member of Parliament to take her seat (Nancy Astor) – for Coalition s 
 1921: British-born member to take her seat (Margaret Wintringham) –  Party 
 1924: Minister (Margaret Bondfield) – for  Party 
 1926: Member to represent more than one constituency in non-consecutive terms (Margaret Bondfield) – Labour Party
 1929: Cabinet minister and privy counsellor (Margaret Bondfield)
 1929: Female Baby of the House (Jennie Lee) – Labour Party
 1929: Independent member elected (Eleanor Rathbone)
 1929: Non-Christian elected (Marion Phillips) – Labour Party
 1929: Shortest-serving member (Ruth Dalton) – Labour Party; equalled in 1974 by Margo MacDonald – 
 1931: Member to cross the floor (Cynthia Mosley) – from Labour to 
 1931: Member to die in office and oldest woman elected (Ethel Bentham) – Labour Party
 1938: Resignation from the House, i.e. appointment to a stewardship (The Duchess of Atholl) –  Party
 1948: Chair of Committee of Whole House (Florence Paton) – Labour Party
 1948: British-born Catholic (Alice Cullen) – Labour Party
 1953: Member from Northern Ireland; first Irishwoman to take her seat (Patricia Ford) – Ulster Unionist Party
 1965: Parliamentary Whip (Harriet Slater) – Labour Party 
 1970: Deputy speaker (Betty Harvie Anderson) –  Party
 1974: Youngest woman to leave the House (Bernadette Devlin McAliskey) – Independent Socialist
 1975: Leader of the Opposition (Margaret Thatcher)
 1976: Member outed as LGBT (Maureen Colquhoun) – Labour Party 
 1979: Prime Minister (Margaret Thatcher) who led the Conservative Party from 1975 to 1990.
 1987: Member from ethnic or racial minorities (Diane Abbott) – Labour Party
 1992: Speaker of the House of Commons (Betty Boothroyd) – Labour Party. As of  she remains the only female to hold the office of House Speaker.
 1997: Full-time Minister for Women (Joan Ruddock) – Labour Party
 1997: Member who came out as LGBT in office (Angela Eagle) – Labour Party
 1998: Chief Whip (Ann Taylor) – Labour Party
 2010: LGBT member elected (Margot James) – Conservative Party
 2010: Minor party members elected (Caroline Lucas – Green Party of England and Wales; Naomi Long – Alliance Party of Northern Ireland)
 2015: Youngest woman elected (Mhairi Black) – SNP
 2016: Cabinet minister to come out in office (Justine Greening) – Conservative Party
 2016: Member to be assassinated (Jo Cox) – Labour Party. She became also the first Labour MP to die as a crime victim.
 2017: Oldest woman to be re-elected (Ann Clwyd) - Labour Party
 2019: Ethnic minority female holder of a Great Office of State (Priti Patel) – Conservative Party
 2019: Non-Christian by choice of conversion elected (Charlotte Nichols) – Labour Party
 2019: Oldest woman to leave the House (Ann Clwyd) – Labour Party
 2022: Youngest, shortest-serving Prime Minister (Liz Truss) and also her party's youngest female parliamentary leader, and female Deputy Prime Minister (Thérèse Coffey) – Conservative Party
 2022: Member to vacate her seat for an actual paid office under the Crown (Rosie Cooper) – Labour Party

Records 

Margaret Beckett is the longest serving female MP in the history of the House of Commons. She was an MP for Lincoln from 10 October 1974 until 7 April 1979, and has served as MP for Derby South since 9 June 1983, most recently being re-elected on 12 December 2019.

Harriet Harman is the longest continuously serving female MP in the history of the House of Commons. She was MP for Peckham from 28 October 1982 until 1 May 1997, and has served as MP for Camberwell and Peckham since 1 May 1997, most recently having been re-elected on 12 December 2019. On 13 June 2017 Harman was dubbed "Mother of the House" by Prime Minister Theresa May, in recognition of her status as longest continuously serving woman MP (though she was not the longest serving MP overall, and would therefore not gain any official duties).

Female MPs with over 25 years' service 
As of 2023, there are 36 women (out of a total of 561) who have served 25 years or more service in the House of Commons, either continuously or cumulatively.

Current representation
As of February 2023, there are 225 female MPs in the House of Commons.

In February 2018 the Electoral Reform Society reported that hundreds of seats were being effectively 'reserved' by men, holding back women's representation. Their report states that 170 seats are being held by men first elected in 2005 or before – with few opportunities for women to take those seats or selections. Broadly speaking, the longer an MP has been in Parliament, the more likely they are to be male.

Current female Cabinet members (Conservative Party) 
 Suella Braverman – Secretary of State for the Home Department
 Kemi Badenoch – Secretary of State for International Trade (2022–23)/Business and Trade (2023–present)/President of the Board of Trade
 Gillian Keegan – Secretary of State for Education
 Penny Mordaunt – Leader of the House of Commons/Lord President of the Council
 Michelle Donelan – Secretary of State for Digital, Culture, Media and Sport (2022–23)/Science, Innovation and Technology (2023–present)
 Thérèse Coffey – Secretary of State for Environment, Food and Rural Affairs
 Lucy Frazer – Secretary of State for Culture, Media and Sport

Historic representation

2019 election 

In the 2019 general election, 220 women were elected, making up 34% of the House of Commons, up from 208 and 32% before the election.

Female Cabinet members appointed after the 2019 election 
 Suella Braverman - Attorney General for England and Wales (2020–22)
 Thérèse Coffey – Secretary of State for Work and Pensions (2019–22)/Health and Social Care & Deputy Prime Minister (2022)
 Michelle Donelan – Secretary of State for Education (2022)
 Nadine Dorries – Secretary of State for Digital, Culture, Media and Sport
 Baroness Evans of Bowes Park – Leader of the House of Lords
 Amanda Milling – Minister Without Portfolio
 Priti Patel – Secretary of State for the Home Department
 Chloe Smith – Secretary of State for Work and Pensions (2022)
 Anne-Marie Trevelyan – Secretary of State for International Development (2020)/International Trade and President of the Board of Trade (2021–22)/Transport (2022)
 Liz Truss – Secretary of State for Foreign, Commonwealth and Developmental Affairs (2021–22)/Prime Minister (2022)

2017 election 

In the 2017 general election, 208 women were elected, making up 32% of the House of Commons, up from 191 and 29% before the election.

Female Cabinet members appointed after the 2017 election 
 Theresa May – Prime Minister
 Liz Truss – Secretary of State for International Trade/President of the Board of Trade
 Thérèse Coffey – Secretary of State for Work and Pensions (2019)
 Baroness Evans of Bowes Park – Leader of the House of Lords
 Penny Mordaunt – Secretary of State for Defence
 Karen Bradley – Secretary of State for Northern Ireland
 Andrea Leadsom – Secretary of State for Business, Energy and Industrial Strategy
 Priti Patel – Secretary of State for the Home Department
 Theresa Villiers – Secretary of State for Environment, Food and Rural Affairs
 Nicky Morgan – Secretary of State for Digital, Culture, Media and Sport
 Esther McVey – Secretary of State for Work and Pensions (2018)
 Amber Rudd – Secretary of State for Work and Pensions (2018–19)

2015 election 

In the 2015 general election, 191 women were elected, making up 29% of the House of Commons, up from 141 and 23% before the election.

Female Cabinet members appointed after the 2015 election 
 Theresa May – Secretary of State for the Home Department
Justine Greening – Secretary of State for International Development
Nicky Morgan – Secretary of State for Education and Minister for Women and Equalities
Baroness Stowell of Beeston – Leader of the House of Lords
Theresa Villiers – Secretary of State for Northern Ireland
Liz Truss – Secretary of State for Environment, Food and Rural Affairs (2014–16)/Justice (2016–17)
Amber Rudd – Secretary of State for Energy and Climate Change

2010 election

As elected in the 2010 general election.

Female Cabinet members appointed after the 2010 election 

 Theresa May – Secretary of State for the Home Department
 Caroline Spelman – Secretary of State for Environment, Food and Rural Affairs
 Cheryl Gillan – Secretary of State for Wales
 Baroness Warsi – Minister without Portfolio

A total of 46 female ministers have held Cabinet positions since the first, Margaret Bondfield, in 1929. Tony Blair's 1997 Cabinet had five women and was the first to include more than two female ministers at one time. The highest number of concurrent women Cabinet ministers under Tony Blair was eight (36 per cent), then a record from May 2006 to May 2007. Other women have attended Cabinet without being full members, including Caroline Flint, Anna Soubry and Caroline Nokes. Some who have attended Cabinet have subsequently, or previously been full Cabinet ministers, including Tessa Jowell, Liz Truss and Andrea Leadsom.

All-women shortlists 

All-women shortlists are a method of affirmative action which has been used by the Labour Party to increase the representation of women in Parliament. As of 2015, 117 Labour MPs have been elected to the House of Commons after being selected as candidates through an all-women shortlist. In 2002 this method of selection was ruled to breach the Sex Discrimination Act 1975. In response to this ruling the Sex Discrimination (Election Candidates) Act 2002 legalised all-women short lists as a method of selection. The Equality Act 2010 extends this exemption from discrimination law to 2030.

Ahead of the next general election, HuffPost reported in March 2022 that Labour stopped using all-women shortlists, citing legal advice that continuing to use them for choosing parliamentary candidates would become an "unlawful" practice again under the Equality Act.

See also

Blair Babe
Election results of women in United Kingdom general elections (1918–1945)
List of female members of the House of Commons of the United Kingdom
Lists of female political office-holders in the United Kingdom
Timeline of female MPs in the House of Commons
Widow's succession
Women in the House of Lords
European countries by percentage of women in national parliaments
Women in positions of power
Critical mass (gender politics)
Women Political Leaders
Women in government

Notes

References

Further reading

External links
 
 
 
 
 

House of Commons of the United Kingdom
Women in the United Kingdom